Abaristophora tonnoiri is a species of fly discovered by Schmitz in 1939. No sub-species specified in Catalogue of Life and listed as Antipodiphora tonnoiri in Systema Dipterorum.

References

Phoridae